Cross and Mauser is a 1925 Soviet silent adventure film directed by Vladimir Gardin.

Plot
The film takes place during the pre-revolutionary years and the initial period of the Soviet regime. At a monastery shelter in one of Russia's western towns, orphan Yulka gives birth to a son from the shepherd Jerome. Matron of the shelter Pavlikha as directed by the father kills the newborn baby and disposes of the corpse in the Jewish Quarter. The Black Hundreds are spreading the rumor that the murder was committed by the Jews for ritual purposes. Mayhem arises which is supported by the authorities of the city. The church refuses to shelter Jews fleeing from the violent thugs ...

Cast
 Yevgeni Chervyakov 
 V. Kiselyova 
 Vladimir Kriger 
 Nikolay Kutuzov
 Naum Rogozhin 
 Pyotr Savin 
 T. Sinitsina 
 Pyotr Starkovsky 
 Raisa Yesipova

References

Bibliography 
 Christie, Ian & Taylor, Richard. The Film Factory: Russian and Soviet Cinema in Documents 1896-1939. Routledge, 2012.

External links 
 

1925 films
Soviet adventure films
Russian adventure films
Soviet silent films
1920s Russian-language films
Films directed by Vladimir Gardin
Soviet black-and-white films
1925 adventure films
Russian black-and-white films
Russian silent films